Logans Ferry Powder Works Historic District is a historic district in Plum, Pennsylvania.  These powder works were started in 1918, and they produced explosive bronze-aluminum powder for use in fireworks and other explosives and pigments for Alcoa.  The works were listed on the National Register of Historic Places on May 7, 1998.  the plant is being dismantled as of 3/6/2015

References

Unfortunately the plant as of 3/6/2015 is being torn down and completely dismantled

Industrial buildings and structures on the National Register of Historic Places in Pennsylvania
Historic districts in Allegheny County, Pennsylvania
Historic districts on the National Register of Historic Places in Pennsylvania
National Register of Historic Places in Allegheny County, Pennsylvania